The Fossa dei Leoni (FDL ) was an association of ultras supporters of Italian professional football club Associazione Calcio Milan. Established in 1968, it was the second ultras group to form in Italy, after Commandos Tigre (also supporters of AC Milan) in 1967.

History

Origin to dissolution
The association was originally a group of young supporters who started to meet on ramp 18 of popular sectors of San Siro stadium, in Milan. They wore the uniform of A.C. Milan and brought flags and confetti to the stadium. The name was chosen due to the nickname of A.C. Milan's old stadium.

In 1972 they moved from ramp 18 to the middle sector of the stadium. That year its hymn was created, inspired by the Italian movie "L'armata Brancaleone". In that period many Italian ultras groups identified themselves with political ideas.FDL identified itself as left wing, displaying a  banner with a picture of Che Guevara. Disorderly conduct problems from 1975 to 1977 led it to change its name to Inferno Rossonero (Red-Black Hell).

FSD became a model for Italian ultras groups. In 1982 it was cited in the Italian movie "Eccezzziunale... veramente". In that movie the starring, Diego Abatantuono, played the group's leader, named Donato, the ras of the Fossa.

Dissolution

After 38 years of activity, FSD was officially dissolved on 17 November 2005 by its members due to polemics about two stolen banners after the match Milan-Juventus of 29 October 2005. During an internal conflict among Milan's supporters FDL was accused of collaborating with DIGOS (unacceptable for ultras ideals) to obtain restitution of the banners and some members were threatened and attacked. At the end of that conflict the leaders of the group decided to dissolve the group.

Other reasons of this conflict are to search in the relationships of the group with two other historical ultras groups of A.C. Milan, Brigate Rossonere and Commandos Tigre, due to its political differences and to a leadership struggle among Milan's supporters. After various attempts to recreate the group, one month later (31 December 2005), the group Guerrieri Ultras Curva Sud Milano was founded, mostly by former members of the Fossa dei Leoni.

Hymn
The FSD hymn is based on to the musical theme of Italian movie "L'armata Brancaleone" (1966), reads:

"Leoni armati stiam marciando siam la Fossa dei Leon...dei leon.. leon.. leon... leon... leon... siam la Fossa dei Leon! Sangue! Violenza! Fossa dei Leoni!"

Rivalries and friendships

FDL formed rivalries and friendships with other groups with other A.C. Milan's supporters.

The principal and the oldest rivalry was against supporters of Inter, the other football club in Milan. Other main rivalries are against supporters of Roma (twinned since early 1980s), S.S.C. Napoli (twinned since early 1980s), Juventus, Lazio, Genoa, Verona, Atalanta, Fiorentina, Sampdoria and Cagliari.

Their only friendships are with the ultras of Brescia.

See also
Tifo and Ultras
List of ultra groups
Derby della Madonnina

References

Bibliography
"Nella Fossa dei Leoni", (1998)

External links
 Official website of Fossa dei Leoni

Italian football supporters' associations
Ultras groups
A.C. Milan